M. Nassar (born 5 March 1958) is an Indian actor, director, producer, dubbing artist, singer and politician who mainly works in the Tamil and Telugu film industries he has also worked in few Malayalam, Kannada,  English, Hindi  and Bengali films. He is the incumbent president of the Nadigar Sangam.

Early life and education
Nassar was born on 5 March 1958 to Mehaboob Basha and Mumtaz in Tamil Nadu, India. He studied in St. Joseph's Higher Secondary School (Chengalpattu).  He moved to Madras (now Chennai) after school, where he finished his pre-university at Madras Christian College. At Madras Christian College, he was an active member of the Dramatic Society. Later for a brief time, he worked in the Indian Air Force. He trained in two acting schools: the South Indian Film Chamber of Commerce's Film Institute and the Tamil Nadu Institute for Film and Television Technology.

Career

Nassar made his acting debut in K. Balachander's Kalyana Agathigal (1985) portraying a secondary supporting role, before moving on to play villainous roles in S. P. Muthuraman's Velaikaran (1987) and Vanna Kanavugal (1987). He played the protagonist in Yuhi Sethu's  Kavithai Paada Neramillai (1987), though his breakthrough role came through his performance as a police officer in Mani Ratnam's Nayakan (1987). He subsequently became a regular in Mani Ratnam and Kamal Haasan's ventures, appearing in pivotal character roles in Roja (1992), Thevar Magan (1992),  Ghazal(1993),"Bombay (1995), Kuruthipunal (1995) and Iruvar (1997).

Nassar made his directorial debut with Avatharam (1995), a film based on the backdrop of a folk art troupe. Starring Revathi as his co-star, Nassar stated that the idea had come to him as a result of his childhood memories of watching theru koothu being performed on the streets alongside his father. The film won critical acclaim, but failed to become a commercially successful venture. Soon afterwards, he made Devathai (1997), stating he remembered a story he had first heard as a child, which became the "creative seed for this film" about reincarnation. He stated that his immediate busy schedule had subsequently cost him a role in Aamir Khan's  Lagaan (2001). He subsequently continued to work in films in the late 1990s, portraying a blind musician in Rajiv Menon's Minsara Kanavu (1997), a political leader in Mani Ratnam's Iruvar (1997) and as the father of a pair of separated twins in S. Shankar's Jeans (1998).

Some of the films that he has acted in Telugu include Chanti (1992), Seshu (2002), Bhageeratha (2005), Athadu (2005), Pokiri (2006), Golimaar (2010), Shakthi (2011), Dookudu (2011), Businessman (2012) and among others.

Besides South Indian language films, he has acted in Hindi language films like Chachi 420 (1997), Phir Milenge (2004), Nishabd (2007), Rowdy Rathore (2012), Saala Khadoos (2016) and Serious Men (2020) among others.

He played Bijjaladeva, a pivotal role in the films Baahubali: The Beginning (2015) and Baahubali 2: The Conclusion (2017).

Personal life
Nassar is married to producer turned politician Kameela and they have three sons. The eldest, Abdul Asan Faizal, was initially reported to be making his acting debut in a film to be produced by T. Siva, but eventually did not do so. In 2014, he was involved in a serious road accident but recovered after being critically injured. Their second son, Luthfudeen, made his acting debut in A. L. Vijay's Saivam (2014) portraying the grandson of the character played by Nassar. Their third son Abi Hassan is also an actor and featured in Nassar's Sun Sun Thatha (2012) as well as Rajesh Selva's 2019 action thriller Kadaram Kondan''.

References

External links
 

Indian male film actors
20th-century Indian film directors
Tamil male actors
Tamil film directors
Indian male voice actors
Living people
1958 births
Male actors in Kannada cinema
Male actors in Tamil cinema
Male actors in Hindi cinema
Male actors in Malayalam cinema
Madras Christian College alumni
Tamil Nadu State Film Awards winners
People from Kanchipuram district
Male actors in Telugu cinema
Film directors from Chennai
Male actors from Chennai
Film producers from Chennai